Jesús Escobar is a professor of art history at Northwestern University in Evanston, Illinois. Escobar specializes in the art, architecture, and urbanism of early modern Spain and Italy and has published articles and reviews in journals of art history and early modern studies. His book The Plaza Mayor and the Shaping of Baroque Madrid (2003) explores the interchange of architecture and politics in the evolution of Madrid from a secondary city of Castile to the seat of a global empire. The book won the Eleanor Tufts Award from the American Society for Hispanic Art Historical Studies and has been revised in a Spanish-language edition published in 2008 by Editorial Nerea. Escobar is working on a new book that examines seventeenth-century architecture and urbanism at the court of Philip IV in Madrid.

Escobar was an associate professor of art history and chair of the Department of Visual and Performing Arts at Fairfield University in Fairfield, Connecticut. He held visiting appointments at MIT and Columbia University. At Northwestern, Escobar has taught undergraduate courses on the High Renaissance in Italy and Baroque Art in Italy, Spain, and France, as well as a graduate seminar on Renaissance architecture in Spain.

Escobar won a Fulbright Senior Scholar Award to Spain where he researched The Plaza Mayor and the Shaping of Baroque Madrid. He has been a fellow of the Center for Advanced Study in the Visual Arts at the National Gallery of Art in Washington, D.C.

Escobar serves on the Editorial Board of caa.reviews, the online review journal of the College Art Association of America, and is editor for the scholarly book series, Buildings, Landscapes, and Societies, published by the Pennsylvania State University Press.

Escobar received his bachelor's degree from Columbia University and doctorate from Princeton University in 1996.

Bibliography
The Plaza Mayor and the Shaping of Baroque Madrid (Cambridge University Press, 2003)

References

Department of Art History at Northwestern University Professor Profile
Department of Art History at Northwestern University
Department of Visual and Performing Arts at Fairfield University
Columbia University Visiting Professor Profile
Cambridge University Press Sample: The Plaza Mayor and the Shaping of Baroque Madrid

Year of birth missing (living people)
Living people
Columbia College (New York) alumni
Princeton University alumni
21st-century American historians
American male non-fiction writers
American art historians
21st-century American male writers

Fairfield University faculty